IEJ may refer to:

 the Iejima Airport
 the Israel Exploration Journal
 the Nazi "Institut zur Erforschung der Judenfrage" ("Institute for Study of the Jewish Question")